Westover is a city in Shelby County, Alabama, United States. The city is part of the Birmingham Metropolitan Statistical Area. The city was officially incorporated on January 31, 2001 although it was established in 1901  and had a population of 961 when it was incorporated in 2001.

History

One structure in Westover, the Archer House, is listed on the Alabama Register of Landmarks and Heritage.

Geography

Westover is located along the busy U.S. Highway 280 corridor in the northeastern quadrant of Shelby County. Via US 280, downtown Birmingham is 26 mi (42 km) northwest, and Harpersville is 5 mi (8 km) east. The Westover City Fire Department is rated a 3/3X by ISO.

Pine Mountain Preserve, the largest development of its kind ever built in the State of Alabama, is an Eddleman Properties development which has been announced. It is on 6,500 acres of property in the City of Westover including a "Town Center". The "Town Center" includes parks, City development sites (City Hall, Library, Fire Stations, etc.), multiple school sites and commercial.

Education

The Shelby County School system covers the City of Westover as well as several area private schools. On July 19, 2011 the City Council passed a Resolution identifying multiple properties, within the Chelsea Area School Zone, available for donation to the Shelby County Board of Education.

Demographics

The City of Westover has experienced significant growth over the last few years. The newest residential subdivisions in the City of Westover include Chelsea Square, Carden Crest, The Villages of Westover, Willow Oaks and Yellowleaf Farms. Over seventy-five percent on the property in the City is owned by residential and or commercial developers.

Government
Larry Riggins, a Westover resident since 1997, was elected mayor of the city in 2016 after many residents became distrustful of the former mayor J. Mark McLaughlin. Mayor Riggins served on the City Council for two terms prior to being elected as mayor. Former mayor J. Mark McLaughlin served as mayor from 2004 to 2016 and chaired the Planning Commission from 2002-2004.

Notable person
Jim Bragan, former college baseball and minor league baseball president
Matt Guerrier, former major league baseball pitcher

References

Cities in Shelby County, Alabama
Cities in Alabama
Birmingham metropolitan area, Alabama